Chaenogaleus is a genus of shark containing two species.  Only one is extant.
 
 Hooktooth shark (Chaenogaleus macrostoma) (Bleeker, 1852)
 †Chaenogaleus affinis (Probst, 1879)

References

 
Shark genera
Taxa named by Theodore Gill
Hemigaleidae